North Gosforth is a suburb and civil parish in the City of Newcastle upon Tyne in Tyne and Wear, England.  It is north of the city centre, and has a population of 3,527, increasing to 5,629 at the 2011 Census.

References

External links

Districts of Newcastle upon Tyne
Civil parishes in Tyne and Wear